Top Country Albums is a chart that ranks the top-performing country music albums in the United States, published by Billboard.  In 1971, 10 different albums topped the chart, which was at the time published under the title Top Country LP's, based on sales reports submitted by a representative sample of stores nationwide.

In the issue of Billboard dated January 2, Ray Price reached number one with his album, For the Good Times, displacing the final chart-topper of 1970, The Johnny Cash Show by Johnny Cash.  Price's album held the top spot for six weeks before losing it to Rose Garden by Lynn Anderson, which remained at number one for 12 consecutive weeks, the year's longest unbroken run atop the chart.  It also marked a record for the longest uninterrupted run at number one on the country albums chart by a female vocalist which would stand until 1989, when Reba McEntire topped the listing for thirteen consecutive weeks with Sweet Sixteen.  The album would have two further single-week runs in the top spot for a final total of 14 weeks at number one.  Anderson would return to the top of the chart in August with You're My Man, which spent seven weeks at number one, and her total of 21 weeks in the top spot in 1971 was the most by any artist.  Although she remained a regular on the country charts for the remainder of the decade and into the 1980s, she did not achieve any further chart-topping albums.

In addition to Anderson, Ray Price and Charley Pride each achieved two number ones during the year.  Price's I Won't Mention It Again received the award for Album of the Year from the Country Music Association but would prove to the be the final number one for the singer, who had achieved much of his success prior to Billboard first publishing a country albums chart in 1964, although he would remain active in the music industry into his 80s.  The final chart-topping album of 1971 was Easy Loving by Freddie Hart, which spent the last nine weeks of the year atop the chart.  It was the first chart-topping album for Hart, who had signed his first recording contract in 1953 and entered the country singles chart for the first time in 1959, but had achieved no significant success until the song "Easy Loving" went to number one in September 1971.  He achieved a run of consistent success until 1975, when his chart placings fell away once again.

Chart history

References

Top Country LP's number ones
1971
Top Country LP's number ones